Julia Viktorovna Guzieva (born 18 December 1988) is a Russian curler from Kaliningrad. She played lead for the Russia women's national curling team at the 2016 European Curling Championships.

Awards
 Russian Women's Curling Championship: Silver (2014, 2016, 2019), Bronze (2012, 2013, 2015)
 Russian Women's SuperCup: Gold (2016)
 Russian Mixed Doubles Curling Cup: Bronze (2011)
 Master of Sports of Russia, International Class (2016)

Teammates
2016 European Curling Championships
 Victoria Moiseeva, Fourth, Skip
 Uliana Vasilyeva, Third
 Galina Arsenkina, Second
 Yulia Portunova, Alternate

References

External links

Living people
1988 births
Russian female curlers
Sportspeople from Kaliningrad
European curling champions
Curlers at the 2018 Winter Olympics
Olympic curlers of Russia